The International Journal of Geometric Methods in Modern Physics is a peer-reviewed journal, published by World Scientific, covering mathematical physics. It was originally published bimonthly beginning in January 2004; as of 2006 it appears 8 times a year. Editorial policy for the journal specifies that "The journal publishes short communications, research and review articles devoted to the application of geometric methods (including differential geometry, algebraic geometry, global analysis and topology) to quantum field theory, non-perturbative quantum gravity, string and brane theory, quantum mechanics, semi-classical approximations in quantum theory, quantum thermodynamics and statistical physics, quantum computation and control theory."

Abstracting and indexing
The journal is indexed in Science Citation Index Expanded, ISI Alerting Services, Inspec, Current Contents/Physical Chemical and Earth Sciences, Mathematical Reviews, Scopus, and Zentralblatt MATH. According to the Journal Citation Reports, the journal has a 2020 impact factor of 1.874.

References 

Mathematics journals
Physics journals
Publications established in 2004
World Scientific academic journals
English-language journals